Sheldon High School or SHS is a 9th–12th grade college-preparatory high school located in unincorporated Vineyard, California, a southeast suburb of Sacramento that is also north of Elk Grove. The school was established in 1997 as part of the Elk Grove Unified School District.

Athletics

Teams 
 Baseball (men's)
 Basketball (men's and women's)
 Cheerleading (women's)
 Cross Country (men's and women's)
 Football (men's)
 Golf (men's and women's)
 Softball (women's)
 Soccer (men's and women's)
 Swimming (men's and women's)
 Tennis (men's and women's)
 Track and Field (men's and women's)
 Volleyball (men's and women's)
 Wrestling (co-ed)

Notable alumni 

Chris Miller - professional football player
Justin Herbert - professional football player
Dakarai Allen - professional basketball player
David Garibaldi - performance painter and artist
Jolene Henderson - professional softball pitcher
Darin Johnson - professional basketball player
Taron Johnson - professional football player
Chris Kelly - screenwriter and director
Austin Madison - animator and artist
Matt Manning - baseball pitcher
Victoria Monét - singer and songwriter
DeMarcus Nelson - professional basketball player
Keith Powers - professional actor

References

External links 
School website

High schools in Sacramento, California
Public high schools in California
1997 establishments in California
Educational institutions established in 1997